Palirisa salex is a moth in the family Eupterotidae. It was described by Pugaev and T.T. Du in 2011. It is found in Vietnam.

References

Moths described in 2011
Eupterotinae